Martin Amlin (born June 12, 1953) is an American composer and pianist. He was born in Dallas, Texas.

He serves as the Mildred P. Gilfillan Professor of Music and Chair of the Department of Composition and Theory at the Boston University College of Fine Arts as well as Senior Director of the Boston University Tanglewood Institute Young Artists Composition Program.

Career
Martin Amlin received Master of Music and Doctor of Musical Arts degrees and the Performer's Certificate from the Eastman School of Music at the University of Rochester. At Eastman he studied piano with Frank Glazer and composition with Joseph Schwantner, Samuel Adler, and Warren Benson. He studied with Nadia Boulanger at the Ecoles d'Art Américaines in Fontainebleau and at the Ecole Normale de Musique in Paris.

Amlin has been a resident at Yaddo, MacDowell, and the Virginia Center for the Creative Arts. He has performed as soloist with the Boston Pops Orchestra and has been a rehearsal pianist for the Boston Symphony Orchestra and the Tanglewood Festival Chorus. He has appeared on the FleetBoston Celebrity Series and with the M.I.T. Experimental Music Studio. He has recorded for the Albany, Ashmont Music, Centaur, Crystal, Hyperion, Koch International, MSR Classics, and Wergo labels, and his music is published by the Theodore Presser Company.

Awards
Grant to Young Composers (ASCAP)
ASCAP Plus Awards (ASCAP)
Kahn Award (Boston University)
Grant from the Massachusetts Artists Foundation
Grant from the Massachusetts Council for the Arts
Grant from the Massachusetts Cultural Council
National Endowment for the Arts Composer Fellowship
Norlin Fellow (MacDowell)
Grant from the St. Botolph Club Foundation
Tanglewood Music Center Fellowships, four summers
Newly published Music Competition winner (National Flute Association)

Works

Orchestra
Quatrains from the Rubáiyát for soprano and chamber orchestra (1977), 15 minutes
Shadowdance for orchestra (1980), 10 minutes
Concerto for Piccolo and Orchestra (1999), 20 minutes
Three Songs of Nature for baritone, solo violin, and chamber orchestra (2008), 10 minutes
Concerto for Flute/Piccolo and Orchestra (2012), 9 minutes
In Memoriam C.D.H. for piccolo and string orchestra (2016), 4 minutes

Chamber ensemble
Endless Ways for two pianos (1981), 12 minutes
Sonata for Flute and Piano (1983), 15 minutes
Morceau de Concours for flute and piano (1986), 3 minutes
Sonata for Viola and Piano (1987), 12 minutes
Atlantic Serenade for flute, clarinet, cello, and piano (1991), 10 minutes
Trio Sonata for flute, clarinet, and piano (1991), 12 minutes
Variations for piano and woodwind quintet (1994), 12 minutes
Prelude, Fugue, and Variations for piano and string quartet (1997), 12 minutes
Sonata for Piccolo and Piano (1997), 20 minutes
Sonatina Piccola for piccolo and piano (1999), 6 minutes
Sonata for Clarinet and Piano (2001), 16 minutes
Intrada for two flutes and piano (2002), 4 minutes
Encomium for viola and harp (2004), 5 minutes
Sonata No. 2 for Flute and Piano (2004), 15 minutes
Moto Perpetuo for string quartet (2006)
String Quartet (2009), 13 minutes
Violetta for viola and piano (2010), 7 minutes
Kennel for viola and piano (2011), 11 minutes
Magic Maze for viola and piano (2017), 8 minutes
Sonata for Trumpet and Piano (2017), 8 minutes
Three Inventions for Five Flutes (doubling Piccolos) (2018), 9 minutes
Vermont Harmony for viola and piano (2019), 5 minutes
Intrada II for two trumpets and piano (2022), 5 minutes

Solo instrument
Prelude: In Praise of the Infinity of Time for organ (1972), 9 minutes
Piano Sonata No. 4 (1973), 17 minutes
L'intrigue des Accords Oubliés for harp (1976), 5 minutes
Piano Sonata No. 5 (1982), 20 minutes
Piano Sonata No. 6 (1987), 10 minutes
Five Preludes for piano (1995), 15 minutes
Eight Variations for Piano (2000), 5 minutes
Piano Sonata No. 7 (2000), 14 minutes
Ephemeropterae I and II for solo piccolo (2004), 3 minutes
Three Alphabetudes for piano (2005), 10 minutes
Fusion Etude for piano (2013), 4 minutes
Solfeggietto Redux for piano (2014), 3 minutes
Quatrain for piano (2015), 2 minutes
Eight Etudes on Intervals for piano (2016), 25 minutes
Piano Sonata No. 8 (2021), 13 minutes

Vocal music
The Three Marias for soprano and piano (1980)
Israfel for soprano, flute, violin, cello, and piano (1980), 5 minutes
Lullaby for tenor and piano (1982), 3 minutes
Passions of Singleness for mezzo-soprano, viola, vibraphone, and harp (1983), 13 minutes
Four Songs on Texts of Anonymous Poets for soprano and piano (1984), 13 minutes
A Lasting Spring for soprano and piano (1985), 12 minutes
Seven Songs for mezzo-soprano and piano (1988), 10 minutes
Time's Caravan for mixed chorus and double string quintet (1989), 12 minutes
The Heavenly Feast for soprano and piano (1993), 8 minutes
The House of Falling Leaves for soprano and piano (1994), 3 minutes
Two Songs On Poems by Anne Fessenden for soprano, alto flute, and piano (2006), 6 minutes
Evening Meditation in a Cathedral Town for mezzo-soprano and piano (2000)
Three Madrigals for mixed chorus and two pianos (2002), 10 minutes
If You Should Go for mezzo-soprano and piano (2020), 2 minutes
Now and Then for mezzo-soprano and piano (2020), 2 minutes

Discography of recordings of his compositions
American Vistas, Albany Records
The Sky's the Limit: A Celebration of 20th Century American Music for Flute, Crystal Records
In Shadow, Light, Crystal Records
About Time: 20th Century Vocal Music, Centaur Records
20th Century Choral Music, Koch International Records
Andrew Willis Plays American Piano Music, Albany Records
An American Menagerie, MSR Classics
Music for Flute, Clarinet, and Piano, Albany Records

Discography of his recordings of works by other composers
Serenade: Music of John Heiss, Albany Records
Chocolates: Music for Viola and Piano by James Grant, MSR Classics
Dedicated to Barrère, Crystal Records
Dedicated to Barrère, Vol. 2, Crystal Records
Boston Symphony's Wayne Rapier Plays Oboe, Boston Records
Brahms: Sonatas, Op. 120; Schumann: Märchenbilder, Op. 113, Ashmont Music
Charles Koechlin: Music for Flute, Hyperion Records
Elliott Carter: Choral Music, Koch International Records
New Computer Music, Wergo Records
Schubert: "Arpeggione" Sonata; Beethoven: Romances Op. 40 & 50, Notturno, Op. 42, Ashmont Music
Vocal Chamber Music: Brahms, Schumann, Massenet, and Boulanger, Titanic Records

External links

 Martin Amlin's page at Theodore Presser Company

References

Living people
21st-century classical composers
20th-century classical composers
1953 births
American male classical composers
American classical composers
Boston University faculty
Eastman School of Music alumni
Musicians from Dallas
Pupils of Samuel Adler (composer)
Tanglewood Music Center alumni
21st-century American composers
20th-century American composers
Classical musicians from Texas
20th-century American male musicians
21st-century American male musicians
Pupils of Joseph Schwantner